Head, Clara and Maria, officially the United Townships of Head, Clara and Maria, is a municipality and incorporated township in Renfrew County in eastern Ontario, Canada, It is on the Ottawa River and on the northern edge of Algonquin Park.

Virtually all the communities (Deux-Rivières, Bissett Creek, Stonecliffe and Mackey) and activities are along Highway 17, the rest of the township is largely crown land which is mostly wilderness.  Head, Clara and Maria is bordered on the north by the Ottawa River and on the south by Algonquin Provincial Park.  Trans Canada Highway 17 runs through the four hamlets which make up this municipality.  The municipality is a remarkable cottage destination with many provincial land use permits allowing cottages on crown land.  Property taxes are the lowest in Renfrew County.

History
The township of Head was named in honour of Sir Edmund Walker Head, 8th Baronet who served as Lieutenant-Governor of New Brunswick 1847-1854 and Governor-General of Canada 1854-1861. The township of Maria was named in honour of his wife, Lady Anna Maria Head (Nee Yorke) (1808-1890).

Communities

The township includes the communities of Aylen, Bissett Creek, Deux-Rivières, Mackey and Stonecliffe. The municipal offices are located in Stonecliffe.

Deux-Rivières is home to Antlers King Fisher Lodge and access to Algonquin Park via the Brent Road.
Stonecliffe is home to Yates General Store, Morning Mist Resort, Pine Valley Lodge, Driftwood Provincial Park and the Municipal Office.
Mackey is home to Lakeview Trailer Park.

Demographics 

Notable people
 Michael James Heney, a railroad contractor of international renown, best known for his work on the first two railroads built in Alaska, the White Pass and Yukon Route and the Copper River and Northwestern Railway, was born in Stonecliffe.

See also
List of townships in Ontario

References

External links
 

Lower-tier municipalities in Ontario
Municipalities in Renfrew County
Township municipalities in Ontario